Arthur Dalby Martin (9 November 1888 – 12 July 1958) was an English cricketer.  Martin's batting and bowling styles are unknown.  He was born at Hackney, London.

Martin made three first-class appearances for Essex against Somerset in 1920 and Northamptonshire and Middlesex in 1921.  He had three batting innings, making a duck in each.  He also took a total of 5 wickets in these matches, which came at an average of 42.00, with best figures of 3/43.

He died on 12 July 1958 at Northwood, Middlesex.

References

External links
Arthur Martin at ESPNcricinfo
Arthur Martin at CricketArchive

1888 births
1958 deaths
People from Hackney Central
Cricketers from Greater London
English cricketers
Essex cricketers